Edin Øy (born 20 May 1997) is a Norwegian footballer who plays for Ullensaker/Kisa.

References

1997 births
Living people
People from Årdal
Norwegian footballers
Sogndal Fotball players
Eliteserien players
Norwegian First Division players
Fana IL players
Ljungskile SK players
Ullensaker/Kisa IL players
Ettan Fotboll players
Association football midfielders
Norwegian expatriate footballers
Expatriate footballers in Sweden
Norwegian expatriate sportspeople in Sweden
Sportspeople from Vestland